Valoris (1963 – after 1982) was a French-bred, Irish-trained Thoroughbred racehorse and broodmare. After showing promising form without winning a race as a juvenile in 1965 she developed into a top-class performer the following spring when she recorded emphatic victories in the Irish 1000 Guineas and the Epsom Oaks. She was well beaten in two subsequent starts and was retired from racing at the end of the year. She later had considerable success as a broodmare.

Background
Valoris was a "tall, dark, leggy" brown mare, with no white markings bred in France by Robert Forget. As a yearling she was bought by the British businessman Charles Clore and was sent into training with Vincent O'Brien at Ballydoyle in Ireland. O'Brien regarded the filly highly although he believed that she had a problem with her eyesight, noting her tendency to "duck away" from objects - even familiar ones - on the training gallops.

Her sire, Tiziano, was bred in Britain but raced in Italy where he won the St Leger Italiano in 1960. Her dam Vali won one race as a three-year-old in 1957 before becoming a very successful broodmare who produced several other winners including the Prix du Jockey Club winner Val de Loir and was the female-line ancestor of Petoski. She was a granddaughter of the influential Irish broodmare Carpet Slipper (foaled 1930), whose other descendants have included Big Brown, Godiva, Golan, North Light and St Jovite.

Racing career

1965: two-year-old season
Valoris ran twice as a two-year-old in Ireland and showed considerable promise although she failed to win on either occasion.

1966: three-year-old season
Valoris began her second season in the Irish 1000 Guineas over one mile at the Curragh in May and went off at odds of 9/1, with her stablemate Glad Rags starting favourite. Ridden by J Power, she won easily from Loyalty (Athasi Stakes) and Lady Clodagh, with Glad Rags unplaced.

Lester Piggott took the ride when Valoris started 11/10 favourite against twelve opponents for the 188th running of the Oaks Stakes over one and a half miles at Epsom Racecourse. The booking of Piggott was controversial as he had been the stable jockey for the Newmarket trainer Noel Murless and had been expected to ride the stable's contender Varinia.Piggott had not been retained in 1966 but had continued to ride for Murless whilst expressing the desire to go freelance. Before the race O'Brien told the jockey "When you do hit the front, just be sure that you catch a good hold of her because with the crowds and the cheering she might easily start to duck around". When Valoris became agitated in the before the race Piggott dismounted and led the filly the last quarter mile to the start. Having tracked the leaders in the early stages Valoris took the lead three furlongs out and won very comfortably by two and a half lengths from the 1000 Guineas runner-up Berkeley Springs with Varinia three lengths back in third.

The filly was expected to follow up in the Irish Oaks at the Curragh in July but failed to reproduce her best form on the prevailing firm ground and finished unplaced behind Merry Mate. In September she was sent to France for the Prix Vermeille over 2400 metres at Longchamp Racecourse but ran unplaced in a race won by Haltilala.

Breeding record
At the end of her racing career, Valoris was retired to become a broodmare for her owner's stud. After Charles Clore's death in 1979, she was auctioned at Keeneland and was bought for $200,000 by Laszlo Urban. She produced at least nine foals and four winners between 1968 and 1982:

Vincennes, a bay filly, foaled in 1968, sired by Vieux Manoir. Won one race, second in Irish Oaks
Valcupid, brown filly, 1969, by Dan Cupid. Failed to win a race.
Relkoris, bay colt, 1970, by Relko
Vals Girl, brown filly, 1972, by Sir Ivor. Won Pretty Polly Stakes, second in Epsom Oaks.
Valinsky, bay colt, 1974, by Nijinsky. Won three races including Geoffrey Freer Stakes.
Vaal Reef, brown filly, 1975, by Mill Reef. Unraced
Raise Your Spirits, colt, 1976, by Raise A Native. Failed to win a race. Sire in Japan.
Salva, brown filly, 1981, by Secretariat. Unraced
Savannah Dancer, brown filly, 1982, by Northern Dancer. Won six races including Del Mar Oaks. Female-line ancestor of One Cool Cat and State Shinto (Prix Dollar).

Assessment and honours
The independent Timeform organisation awarded Valoris a rating of 120 in 1966. In their book, A Century of Champions, based on the Timeform rating system, John Randall and Tony Morris rated Valoris an "inferior" winner of the Oaks.

Pedigree

References

1963 racehorse births
Racehorses bred in France
Racehorses trained in Ireland
Thoroughbred family 5-h
Epsom Oaks winners